Harri U. Kulovaara is a Finnish naval architect and the Executive Vice President for Maritime & Newbulding for Royal Caribbean Cruises Ltd.

Early life

Kulovaara was raised in Turku. He received a Master of Science Degree in civil engineering from the Technical University of Helsinki.

Career
Kulovaara designed two ferries for Silja Line, including the MS Silja Serenade. He was the Senior Vice President of Eff John International.

In 1995, Kulovaara and Njål Eide were hired by Royal Caribbean Cruises Ltd to run the company's shipbuilding. They oversaw the development of the MS Voyager of the Seas. Since 1995, Kulovaara has designed ten ships which were the largest passenger ship when launched.

He won the Elmer A. Sperry Award in 2016.

He is a visiting professor at the University of Strathclyde.

Personal life
Kulovaara lives in Miami, Florida.

References

Living people
Naval architects
Finnish expatriates in the United States
Year of birth missing (living people)